Bob Andelman (October 9, 1960 – February 24, 2020) was a writer and podcaster.  Andelman was the author or co-author of many books about business, culture, and the arts, and produced interviews with figures in popular culture as "Mr. Media".

Andelman authored Will Eisner: A Spirited Life for the M Press imprint of Dark Horse Comics.  Based on some of the final interviews with Eisner and with an introduction by Michael Chabon, the book was published on November 2, 2005.

Andelman collaborated with various business leaders in writing books including company profiles and strategy handbooks.  These include Built From Scratch: How A Couple of Regular Guys Grew the Home Depot From Nothing to $30 Billion, with the founders of Home Depot, and The Profit Zone: How Strategic Business Design Will Lead You To Tomorrow’s Profits with Adrian J. Slywotzky and David J. Morrison.

Andelman founded the Mr. Media website in 1995. The website currently features a variety of interviews of media and entertainment figures by Andelman.

Recognition 
Andelman was recognized as one of the Talkers Magazines "Frontier Fifty: A Selection of Outstanding Talk Media Webcasters," in both 2010 and 2011.

Personal life 
Andelman's hometown was North Brunswick, New Jersey. After graduating from North Brunswick Township High School, he attended the University of Florida College of Liberal Arts and Sciences. He lived in the Tampa Bay area since 1982. Since 1988, he was married to Mimi Andelman, a journalist at the Tampa Bay Times.  They had one child, Charlie.

Selected books 
 Why Men Watch Football, Acadian House Publishing, 1993, 
 Will Eisner: A Spirited Life, M Press, 2005, 

As co-author
 Albert J. Dunlap with Bob Andelman, Mean Business: How I Save Bad Companies and Make Good Companies Great, Crown Business, 1996, 
 Adrian J. Slywotzky and David J. Morrison with Bob Andelman, The Profit Zone: How Strategic Business Design Will Lead You to Tomorrow's Profits. Crown Business, 1997, 
 Bernie Marcus and Arthur Blank with Bob Andelman, Built from Scratch: How A Couple of Regular Guys Grew the Home Depot From Nothing to $30 Billion. Crown Business, 1999, 
 Howard Stoeckel with Bob Andelman, The Wawa Way: How a Funny Name and Six Core Values Revolutionized Convenience. Running Press, 2014, 
 Herman J. Russell with Bob Andelman, Building Atlanta: How I Broke Through Segregation to Launch a Business Empire Chicago Review Press, 2014, 
 Pat Brown with Bob Andelman, The Profiler: My Life Hunting Serial Killers and Psychopaths, Hyperion Books, 2010,

References 

1960 births
2020 deaths
American business writers
Deaths from cancer in Florida